Arena Antonio Alexe is an indoor arena located in Oradea, Romania. The arena is named after the Romanian basketball player Antonio Alexe. It is the home arena of the men's professional basketball and handball clubs of CSM Oradea. Arena hosted B group of EuroBasket Women 2015.

References

1979 establishments in Romania
Sports venues completed in 1979
Buildings and structures in Bihor County
Sport in Oradea
Basketball venues in Romania
Handball venues in Romania
Volleyball venues in Romania
Indoor arenas in Romania
Sports venues in Romania
Music venues completed in 1979
Music venues in Romania